"United We Fall" is word play on the motto "united we stand, divided we fall".

United We Fall may also refer to:

Music
 United We Fall (album), a 2005 album by Canadian hip hop group Sweatshop Union
 "United We Fall", a song on the Torment album by Zoogz Rift
 "United We Fall", a song on the End of Disclosure album by Swedish death metal band Hypocrisy
 "United We Fall", a song on the Revolt album by The Dreams
 "United We Fall", a song written by Mick Moss

Film and television
 United We Fall, a 2014 film by Gary Sinyor
 United We Fall (TV series), an American television sitcom
 "United We Fall", an episode from series 8 of the UK series Casualty
 "United We Fall", an episode of Ink (TV series)

Literature
 United We Fall: Boardroom Truths About the Beautiful Game, a 2007 book by Peter Ridsdale
 United We Fall: The Crisis of Democracy in Canada, a 1993 book by Susan Delacourt
 UNITed We Fall, a Doctor Who short story by Keith DeCandido printed in Decalog 3: Consequences

See also

 
 
 United We Stand (disambiguation)
 Divided We Fall (disambiguation)
 Divided We Stand (disambiguation)